Sovershennyy is a corvette in the Steregushchy-class in service with the Russian Navy. The ship was laid down in 2006 and launched in 2015. She commenced sea trials in early 2017 and joined the Russian Pacific Fleet on 20 July 2017. She was the first large surface warship to join the Pacific Fleet in 25 years.

Between 3 and 10 June 2022, Sovershennyy, along with destroyer Admiral Panteleyev, corvettes Gromkiy, Aldar Tsydenzhapov and intelligence ship Marshal Krylov, took part in naval exercises in the Pacific Ocean. More than 40 warships and support vessels, as well as around 20 aircraft, were involved in the exercises.

References

2015 ships
Ships built by Amur Shipbuilding Plant
Steregushchiy-class corvettes